Chatty or Chattie may refer to:

Surname
 Dawn Chatty (born 1947), American social anthropologist and professor
 Habib Chatty (1916–1991), Tunisian politician and diplomat
 Kerim Chatty (born 1973), Swede suspected of attempted hijacking of an airplane in 2002

Nickname or given name
 "Chattie", nickname of Charlotte Cooper (tennis) (1870–1966), English tennis player
 Chattie Davidson, Auburn Tigers quarterback in 1931 - see List of Auburn Tigers starting quarterbacks
 Charlotte Harnett, whose nickname led to an area being named first Chattie's Wood, then Chatswood, New South Wales
 Charlotte "Chatty" MacLean, a fictional character in the novel Anne of Windy Poplars, by Lucy Maud Montgomery

See also
 Chaty, a near-extinct ethnic group of Russia

Lists of people by nickname